The 2004 O'Byrne Cup was a Gaelic football competition played by the teams of Leinster GAA, as well as one college team.

O'Byrne Cup
* = after extra time

References

External links
Leinster G.A.A. Results 2004

O'Byrne Cup
O'Byrne Cup